Criocerini is a tribe of shining leaf beetles belonging to the family Chrysomelidae and subfamily Criocerinae.

Genera
Genera within this tribe include:

Crioceris Müller, 1764 
Lilioceris Reitter, 1912

References

Bibliography 

 

Criocerinae
Beetle tribes
Taxa named by Pierre André Latreille